The Americano is an IBA official cocktail composed of Campari, sweet vermouth, and for the sparkling version, club soda and garnished with a slice of lemon.

History 

The cocktail was first served in creator Gaspare Campari's bar, Caffè Campari in Milan, in the 1860s. It is the direct descendant of the "Milano-Torino" which consisted of Campari, the bitter liqueur from Milan (Milano) and Punt e Mes, the vermouth from Turin (Torino) but lacked soda water. This drink was itself a descendant of the "Torino-Milano", a concoction consisting of equal parts Campari and Amaro Cora.

In popular culture
It is the first drink ordered by James Bond in the first novel in Ian Fleming's series, Casino Royale. In From Russia With Love, Bond drinks "two excellent Americanos" in Rome during his flight to Istanbul.  In the short story "From a View to a Kill", Bond chooses an Americano as an appropriate drink for a mere café; suggesting that "in cafés you have to drink the least offensive of the musical comedy drinks that go with them." Bond always stipulates Perrier, for, in his opinion, expensive soda water was the cheapest way to improve a poor drink. In The Tourist (2010 film), Elise and Fred each had an Americano (or two) before their fancy dinner at a Venetian restaurant, and resumed drinking that post-dinner back in their hotel room.

See also

 List of cocktails
 List of cocktails (alphabetical)
 List of IBA official cocktails
 Negroni

References

Cocktails with vermouth
Cocktails with Campari
Cocktails with club soda